Allahkaram Esteki (born 19 March 1988) is an Iranian handball player who plays for BM Puente Genil and the Iran men's national handball team. His brother is Sajjad Esteki.

He was Iran's top scorer after netting 30 goals in World Championship.

Achievements 
Coupe de France:
Winner: 2016
Coupe de la Ligue:
Winner: 2016
Supercupa României:2016
'''ehf cup ourope csm Bucharest 2018

References

Iranian male handball players
Sportspeople from Isfahan
Living people
1988 births
Asian Games silver medalists for Iran
Asian Games bronze medalists for Iran
Asian Games medalists in handball
Handball players at the 2006 Asian Games
Handball players at the 2010 Asian Games
Expatriate handball players
Iranian expatriates in France
Iranian expatriates in Qatar
Iranian expatriates in Romania
Montpellier Handball players
CS Dinamo București (men's handball) players
Medalists at the 2006 Asian Games
Medalists at the 2010 Asian Games
21st-century Iranian people